Since its inception in 2004, National Preparedness Month is observed each September in the United States of America. It is sponsored by the Federal Emergency Management Agency (FEMA) within the Department of Homeland Security and encourages Americans to take steps to prepare for emergencies in their communities. FEMA's Ready Campaign, the correlating public education outreach campaign, disseminates information to help the general public prepare for and respond to emergencies, including natural disasters and potential terrorist attacks.

History
Since September 11, 2001, the US Government has taken steps to encourage citizens to make their own survival preparations. September was chosen due to the September 11 attacks and because the peak of the Atlantic hurricane season is in mid-September.

Important Preparedness Steps
As of 2016, the National Household Survey revealed that, while more than 75% of Americans surveyed report having supplies set aside in their homes just for disasters, less than 50% have a household emergency plan. National Preparedness Month encourages individuals get an emergency supply kit, make a family emergency plan, be informed about different emergencies that may affect them, and get trained and become engaged in community preparedness and response efforts.

Businesses are encouraged to document their property and equipment, back up business-critical information, and put a response team in place.

References 

Disaster preparedness in the United States
Month-long observances
September observances
Observances in the United States